Kashechewan Airport  is located  west of the First Nations community of Kashechewan, Ontario, Canada.

The airport handles turboprop aircraft only.

Airlines and destinations

References

External links

Certified airports in Kenora District